Get It Away is the second release from the Boston hardcore punk band SS Decontrol. It is the first release to feature Francois Levesque. The cover art, featuring a trash-strewn city street, was done by Pushead, who spelled out his girlfriend's name in part of the trash.

Track listing

Personnel
Springa - vocals
Al Barile - guitar
Francois Levesque - guitar
Jaime Sciarappa - bass
Chris Foley - drums

References

1983 albums
SSD (band) albums
Albums with cover art by Pushead